Stoyan Stoyanov (1913–1997) was a Bulgarian fighter ace of World War II.

Stoyan Stoyanov may also refer to:

 Stoyan Stoyanov (gymnast) (born 1931), Bulgarian Olympic gymnast
 Stoyan Stoyanov (rower) (born 1956), Bulgarian Olympic rower
 Stoyan Stoyanov (volleyball) (born 1947), Bulgarian Olympic volleyball player
 Stoyan Stoyanov (wrestler) (born 1968), Bulgarian Olympic wrestler